Fred E. Wright (1868-1936) was an American producer, scenarist, silent film director. He was born in Catskill, New York and died in Los Angeles, California. He was married to actress Nell Craig. Prior to entering silent films he was a producer on Broadway.

Filmography
the Clutch of Conscience (1913)*short
Innocence (1913)*short
The Escape (1913)*short
The Sheriff's Reward (1913)*short
The Engineer's Daughter (1913)*short
The Italian Bride (1913)*short
The Crooked Bankers (1913)*short
Puttin' It Over on Papa (1913)*short
A Redskin's Mercy (1913)*short
What the Good Book Taught (1913)*short
The Governor's Double (1913)*short
The Outlaw's Love (1913)*short
The Trapper's Mistake (1913)*short
The Missionary's Triumph (1913)*short
The Miner's Destiny (1913)*short
The Call of the Blood (1913)*short
The Price of Jealousy (1913)*short
The Accidental Shot (1913)*short
Her Brave Rescuer (1913)*short
The Blind Gypsy (1913)*short
Lillie's Nightmare (1913)*short
The Depth of Hate (1913)*short
Race Memories (1913)*short
A Break for Freedom (1913)*short
An Indian Don Juan (1913)*short
Down Lone Gap Way (1914)*short
Where the Heart Calls (1914)*short
The Bond of Love (1914)*short
Graustark (1915)
The White Sister (1915)
The Whirlpool (1915)*short
In the Palace of the King (1915)
The Second Son (1915)*short
Captain Jinks of the Horse Marines (1916)
The Little Shepherd of Bargain Row (1916)
Power (1916)*short
The War Bride of Plumville (1916)*short
The Prince of Graustark (1916)
The Breaker (1916)
The Trufflers (1917)
Be My Best Man (1917)*short
The Man Who Was Afraid (1917)
Star Dust (1917)*short
The Fable of Prince Fortunatus, Who Moved Away from Easy Street, and Silas, the Saver, Who Movied In (1917)*short
The Fibbers (1917)
The Kill-Joy (1917)
The Mysterious Client (1918)
For Sale (1918)

References

External links

1868 births
1936 deaths
People from Catskill, New York
Film directors from New York (state)